Füzesabony is a town in Heves County, Hungary.

References

External links

  in Hungarian

Populated places in Heves County